Astictopterus anomoeus, the yellow hopper, is a species of butterfly in the family Hesperiidae. It is found in Guinea, Sierra Leone, Liberia, Ivory Coast, Ghana and Togo. The habitat consists of wetter forests, with a broken canopy, allowing the development of grassy areas.

Adults of both sexes are attracted to flowers.

References

Butterflies described in 1879
Astictopterini
Butterflies of Africa